Prakashan Parakkatte is a 2022 Indian Malayalam-language family drama film directed by Shahad Nilambur and written by Dhyan Sreenivasan. It stars Mathew Thomas, Dileesh Pothan, Nisha Sarang, Saiju Kurup, Aju Varghese, Dhyan Sreenivasan, Malavika Manoj and Sreejith Ravi. Rathin Radhakrishnan edits the film while Guruprasad handles the cinematography. Shaan Rahman composes the original songs and background score. The film is produced by Aju Varghese and Visakh Subramaniam under Funtasic Films in association with Tinu Thomas ' Hit Makers Entertainments. The film also marks the debut of 5 year old Ritunjay, son of actor Sreejith Ravi and grandson of actor T. G. Ravi.

The film was released in theatres on 17 June 2022.

Premise
Dasan son of Prakashan is a 12th standard student who is a habitual absentee at his school. Instead of going to classes he roams around town with his close friend Anwar. He feels disillusioned with his family when they celebrate his little brother Akhil's successes and birthday. Meanwhile, he falls in love with Neethu and pursues that relationship. Carelessness from Dasan causes his brother a near-fatal accident. This and his failure in final exam cause changes in the way he carried on with his life.

Cast
 Mathew Thomas as Das Prakashan, Prakashan's older son
 Dileesh Pothan as Prakashan
 Nisha Sarang as Latha, Prakashan's wife
 Malavika Manoj as Neethu
 Govind V Pai as Anwar
 Saiju Kurup as Kuttan (aka Kozhi Kuttan)
 Aju Varghese as Musthafa (Cameo appearance)
 Dhyan Sreenivasan as Suni Maash (aka Passion Suni)
 Sreejith Ravi as Sakhavu Raghavan
 Ritunjay Sreejith as Akhil Prakashan, Prakashan's younger son
 Nithin Sabu as Vinu, Prakashan's sister's son
 Stevin Biju as guest role

Production
The film was announced on 14 November 2020 on children's day as the movie followed the dreams of a young boy. Principal photography of the film began on 18 January 2021 at Poovaranthode, Aanakkampoyil and Kozhikode city. The filming was completed on 16 February 2021.

Release
The film released in theatres on 17 June 2022.

Home media
The post-theatrical streaming rights of the film was bought by ZEE5 and the satellite rights of the film was bought by Zee Keralam.

References

External links
 

Films shot in Kozhikode
Indian family films
2020s Malayalam-language films